Hans-Dieter Lange (20 June 1926 – 18 May 2012) was a German TV journalist and anchorman of the East German newscast Aktuelle Kamera.

Biography 
Lange was born in Elbing (Elbląg), Germany. After passing his Abitur he started to attend the stage school in Danzig. In 1944, he was drafted  to the Wehrmacht and became a Canadian prisoner of war in 1945. Until 1946 he was deployed as an ambulanceman for the UNRRA at Bergen-Belsen DP camp.
Lange worked as an actor at the theaters of Hildesheim and Bonn and started to work for the East German radio in 1950 and the East German TV station in 1963. Until 1990 he presented the main newscast Aktuelle Kamera.

References

External links

1926 births
2012 deaths
People from Elbląg
People from East Prussia
German television journalists
East German television personalities
East German journalists
German broadcast news analysts
German military personnel of World War II
German prisoners of war in World War II